Tihomir Atanassov Dovramadjiev (born May 22, 1979, in Varna, Bulgaria; also known as Tihomir Titschko ("Titschko" being a short form of "Tihomir") and as TigerTAD on the Playchess server, is a Bulgarian chess FIDE master and chess boxer. He became the first European chess boxing champion from Berlin, Germany, in 2005. with both World Chess Boxing Organisation - WCBO and World Chess Boxing Association - WCBA acknowledgments. He has held the International Chess Federation - FIDE title of FIDE master since 2004. Recently, he has held the position of associate professor in the Department of Industrial Design at the Technical University of Varna.

Early years and sport activity 
Before taking up chess boxing, Dovramadjiev won the Bulgarian national chess championship in his age group multiple times and had played in international chess tournaments.
 
He was the national youth chess champion of Bulgaria in 1991 (classic), 1993 (classic), 1997 (blitz), and 1998 (classic). He was a member of the youth team of the Bulgarian National Chess Team, together with the world chess champions GM Veselin Topalov and GM Antoaneta Stefanova. He also participated in a number of European and world youth championships, 5th place at the 1991 European Championship in Mamaia, Romania; 3rd–4th place at the 1991 World Championship in Warsaw, Poland; and 2nd-3rd place at the 1993 European Rapid Chess Championship in Paris, France.

In 2001 and 2008, he won the chess section of the Varna Sport Universiade. In 1997, he was on the 1st place Kaissa team from Varna at the youth team championship in Plovdiv. He continued to compete on teams from Varna, as well as on the Lokomotiv team from Plovdiv, Bulgaria. He then played in the German team league, where he competed for SV Nashuatec of Berlin, Germany, which won the German Landesliga for the 2003–2004 season, defeating the Gillette team in the decisive match. For the Nashuatec team, he recorded a result of 22 wins, 2 draws, and 0 defeats.

He has successfully participated in a number of online championships, repeatedly ranking among the top three in tournaments held by ChessBase / Playchess Germany. , his FIDE Elo rating is 2356.

Tihomir Titschko and chess boxing 
In 2003 Titschko was invited by the World Chess Boxing Organisation (WCBO) to participate in their tournaments. In October 2005, he won the first European Chess Boxing Championship by defeating Andreas Schneider (Germany) in the final event. The event was covered by a number of international media, such as Eurosport, Sports Illustrated, CNN, the Los Angeles Times, Die WELT, ChessBase, and others. A detailed video report was presented on the German television channel RBB Fernsehen.

Recent career in academia 

In parallel with his sports activities in the first decade of the 21st century, Titschko has continued his career in academia. 
In 2002–2006, at the Technical University of Varna, Bulgaria (TU-Varna), he earned a master's degree in ergonomics and industrial design. In 2007–2009, he earned a master's in social and legal sciences, criminology, and social prevention. In 2009–2012 he was a full-time doctoral student at TU-Varna. He successfully defended his doctoral thesis: "Creating a design of osseointegrated dental implants" and received a PhD in 2012. The official state data are available on the website of Bulgarian National Centre for Information and Documentation (NACID). During his doctoral studies, he also taught as a lecturer. In 2012, he became an assistant professor at TU-Varna, in the Department of Industrial Design.

In 2018, after winning a government-sponsored competition, he held the academic position of associate professor at TU-Varna.
Currently, his activities include teaching within the university, mentoring of undergraduate and graduate students, and participation in research projects. , according to ResearchGate, his scientific publications have over 300K views. In 2020, as a coordinator for TU-Varna, with his international colleagues from nine partner countries, he participated in the creation of the Ergonomics and Human Factors Regional Educational CEEPUS Network. 

, he is on the editorial board of the IETI Transactions on Ergonomics and Safety (TES, ISSN 2520-5439) and IETI Transactions on Engineering Research and Practice (TERP, ISSN 2616-1699) of the International Engineering and Technology Institute.  He participated in the 16th International Symposium in Management Management, Innovation and Entrepreneurship in Challenging Global Times. He is an academic member and special issue editor of MDPI Mathematics (ISSN 2227-7390; Journal Rank: JCR - Q1 (Mathematics) / CiteScore - Q1 (General Mathematics); Impact Factor: 2.592 (2021) ; 5-Year Impact Factor: 2.542 (2021)) Special Issue "Mathematics and Computer Programming in 2D and 3D Open Source Software". He has acted as chairman, author, or reviewer of the Applied Human Factors and Ergonomics (AHFE) conference, the International Conference on Human Systems Engineering and Design (IHSED), the Intelligent Human Systems Integration (IHSI) conference, the International Conference on Human Interaction and Emerging Technologies (IHIET), the International Symposium in Management (SIM), and other international science conferences and congresses.

References

External links
 Tihomir Dovramadjiev official website
 
 Tihomir Dovramadjiev - YouTube Channel

1979 births
Living people
Bulgarian male boxers
Bulgarian chess players
Chess boxers
Chess FIDE Masters
Sportspeople from Varna, Bulgaria